Dimitrios Soultanopoulos (born ) is a Greek male retired volleyball player. He had 33 appearances with the Greece national team.

Sporting achievements

National championships

 2006/2007  Greek Championship with Olympiacos S.F. Piraeus
 2007/2008  Greek Championship with Olympiacos S.F. Piraeus
 2008/2009  Greek Championship with Olympiacos S.F. Piraeus
 2009/2010  Greek Championship with Olympiacos S.F. Piraeus
 2011/2012  Greek Championship with Foinikas Syros V.C.
 2013/2014  Greek Championship with Kifissia V.C. Athens
 2015/2016  Greek Championship with Olympiacos S.F. Piraeus

National cups

 2008/2009  Greek Cup, with Olympiacos S.F. Piraeus
 2009/2010  Greek Cup runners up, with Olympiacos S.F. Piraeus
 2012/2013  Greek Cup runners up, with Foinikas Syros V.C.
 2013/2014  Greek Cup runners up, with Kifissia V.C. Athens
 2015/2016  Greek Cup, with Olympiacos S.F. Piraeus
 2015/2016  Greek Cup, with Olympiacos S.F. Piraeus
 2015/2016  Greek League Cup, with Olympiacos S.F. Piraeus
 2016/2017  Greek League Cup, with Olympiacos S.F. Piraeus

Individual

 2016 Greek Cup: Most Valuable Player
 2016 Greek League Cup: Most Valuable Player

References

External links
 Dimitris Soultanopoulos at CEV official website
 profile at greekvolley.gr
 Greek Cup History at volleyball.gr - Greek Federation official web site

1981 births
Living people
Greek men's volleyball players
Olympiacos S.C. players
Volleyball players from Athens